Eleni Marie Benson (born 12 January 1983) is an American-born Greek former footballer who played as a defender. She has been a member of the Greece women's national team.

College career
Benson attended the Yale University in New Haven, Connecticut.

International career
Benson played for Greece at senior level in the 2004 Summer Olympics.

Personal life
Benson is married and has added her married name, Rettig, to her American nationality.

See also
 Greece at the 2004 Summer Olympics

References

External links

Yale Daily News
www.greeknewsonline.com

www.ussoccer.com
yalebulldogs.com

1983 births
Living people
Women's association football defenders
Greek women's footballers
Greece women's international footballers
Olympic footballers of Greece
Footballers at the 2004 Summer Olympics
American women's soccer players
Soccer players from Connecticut
People from Willington, Connecticut
American people of Greek descent
Sportspeople of Greek descent
Citizens of Greece through descent
Yale Bulldogs women's soccer players